Vindicated: Big Names, Big Liars, and the Battle to Save Baseball is a 2008 book written by former Major League Baseball player José Canseco. This book, similar to his first, Juiced: Wild Times, Rampant 'Roids, Smash Hits & How Baseball Got Big (2005), focuses mainly on steroids in baseball. Vindicated has made several headlines.  Canseco also writes of the now infamous 1998 party at his home.

References

External links
Excerpt: Vindicated: Big Names, Big Liars, and the Battle to Save Baseball ABC News

2008 non-fiction books
Major League Baseball books
Doping in baseball
Major League Baseball controversies